Odpotovanja  is the first studio album by Slovene musician Tomaž Pengov. It was recorded in 1973 and released on vinyl. This album is considered to be the first independently released record in former Yugoslavia. It was reissued in 1981 in stereo; the original mono edition is very rare now.

Track listing 
All songs written by Tomaž Pengov.
Side one
 "Cesta" – 4:17
 "Danaja" – 3:15
 "V Nasmehu Nekega Dneva" – 3:50
 "Potovanje nespečih" – 3:34
 "Matala" – 2:20
 "Čakajoč nase, brat" – 4:20
 "Narodna Pesem" – 3:00
 "Kretnje" – 3:10
Side two
 "Druga jesen" – 3:45
 "Oče" – 7:25
 "Sarkofagi" – 4:37
 "Ladje prostora" – 7:57
 "Epistola" – 5:30

Personnel 
 Tomaž Pengov – accoutic guitar, 12 string lute, vocals
 Milan Dekleva – liner notes, guest performer
 Bogdana Herman – female vocals
 Aleksander Zorn – guest performer
 Andrej Zdravič – guest performer
 Jurij Detiček – guest performer
 Matjaž Zajec – guest performer
 Metka Zupančič – guest performer
 Tone Koštomaj – guest performer
 Janez Brecelj – photography
 Janez Krall – producer
 Aco Razbornik – recorder
 Matjaž Vipotnik – design

References 

1973 albums
Tomaž Pengov albums